Marija Kaznačenko (born 1 December 1993 in Visaginas, Lithuania) is a Lithuanian biathlete. She competed in the 2014/15 World Cup seasons, and represented Lithuania at the Biathlon World Championships 2015 in Kontiolahti.

References

External links 
 

1993 births
Living people
Lithuanian female biathletes
Lithuanian female cross-country skiers
Cross-country skiers at the 2018 Winter Olympics
Olympic cross-country skiers of Lithuania